The GM Vauxhall Conference season of 1992–93 was the fourteenth season of the Football Conference.

Overview
Wycombe Wanderers, runners-up a year earlier, finally gained the Conference title – and a place in the Football League at the expense of the bottom placed Third Division 
club Halifax Town.

New teams in the league this season
 Bromsgrove Rovers (promoted 1991–92)
 Stalybridge Celtic (promoted 1991–92)
 Woking (promoted 1991–92)
 Dagenham & Redbridge inherited Redbridge Forest's place after the latter's merger with Dagenham

Final  league table

Results

Promotion and relegation

Promoted
 Wycombe Wanderers (to the Football League Third Division)
 Southport (from the Northern Premier League)
 Dover Athletic (from the Southern Premier League)

Relegated
 Halifax Town (from the Football League Third Division)
 Boston United (to the Northern Premier League)
 Farnborough Town (to the Southern Premier League)

Top scorers in order of league goals

References

External links
 1992–93 Conference National Results

National League (English football) seasons
5